Horace Horton (October 9, 1823 – February 18, 1902) was a Canadian insurance agent and political figure. He represented Huron Centre in the House of Commons of Canada from 1872 to 1878 as a Liberal member.

He was born in Stalisfield, Kent, England, the son of Henry Horton,  came to Upper Canada with his family in 1831 and was educated in Goderich. He married Hannah, the daughter of Robert Gibbons. He was mayor of Goderich from 1872 to 1874. Horton resigned in October 1878 to accept a post in the office of the Auditor General.

External links 
 
The Canadian parliamentary companion, 1877, CH Mackintosh

1823 births
1912 deaths
Liberal Party of Canada MPs
Members of the House of Commons of Canada from Ontario
Mayors of places in Ontario
People from Stalisfield Green